Curto is a surname originating from either Spain, Portugal or Italy. The following individuals have that surname:
Frank Curto (1946–1971) chief horticulturist for the Pittsburgh Department of Parks and Recreation
Frank Curto Park, a sculpture-filled city park in Pittsburgh, Pennsylvania
Héctor del Curto, Argentine tango bandoneon player.
Juan Carlos Curto, Argentine judge
Manuel Curto, Portuguese footballer
Silvio Curto, Italian Egyptologist
Víctor Curto, Spanish footballer

Fictional Characters
Ray Curto, a fictional character on the HBO original series The Sopranos